John V. Sheridan (February 3, 1879 in New York City – October 14, 1947) was an American lawyer and politician from New York.

Life
Sheridan was a member of the New York State Assembly (New York Co., 35th D.) in 1907, 1908 and 1909.

He was a member of the New York State Senate (22nd D.) in 1917 and 1918.

During the 1930s, he opposed the Democratic leader of the Bronx Edward J. Flynn; and in 1938, he supported Republican Thomas E. Dewey for Governor.

Sources
 BRONX DEMOCRAT SUPPORTS DEWEY; Ex-State Senator J. V. Sheridan Urges Independents to Back Rotation in Office in NYT on October 23, 1938 (subscription required)
 JOHN V. SHERIDAN, 67, FLYNN'S FOE IN BRONX in NYT on October 15, 1947 (subscription required)

1879 births
1947 deaths
Democratic Party New York (state) state senators
20th-century American politicians
Politicians from the Bronx